Crystian Souza Carvalho (born 10 June 1992), simply known as Crystian, is a Brazilian footballer who plays for Figueirense as a right back.

Career
Born in Goiânia, Goiás, Crystian joined Santos' youth setup in 2009, aged 17, after starting it out at Vila Nova. On 21 January 2011 he was promoted to the former's main squad by manager Adílson Batista.

On 5 February Crystian made his professional debut, playing the last 24 minutes of a 1–1 away draw against Santo André for the Campeonato Paulista championship. He made his Série A debut on 31 August, coming on as a late substitute in a 3–3 away draw against Internacional.

On 8 December 2012, Crystian was loaned to Botafogo-SP, along with two teammates. He subsequently served another temporary deals at Boa Esporte and Paulista, never as a regular starter.

Ahead of the 2020 season, Crystian returned to his first club Vila Nova.

Career statistics

International career
Crystian appeared in two matches with Brazil under-17's in 2009 FIFA U-17 World Cup, against Japan and Mexico.

Honours
Santos
 Campeonato Paulista: 2011, 2012

Paysandu
 Campeonato Paraense: 2016
 Copa Verde: 2016

References

External links
 Futebol de Goyaz profile 
 

1992 births
Living people
Sportspeople from Goiânia
Brazilian footballers
Association football defenders
Campeonato Brasileiro Série A players
Campeonato Brasileiro Série B players
Santos FC players
Botafogo Futebol Clube (SP) players
Boa Esporte Clube players
Paulista Futebol Clube players
Paraná Clube players
Paysandu Sport Club players
Clube Atlético Penapolense players
Esporte Clube XV de Novembro (Piracicaba) players
Barretos Esporte Clube players
Vila Nova Futebol Clube players
Figueirense FC players
Brazil youth international footballers